Amos Nourse (December 17, 1794April 7, 1877) was a medical doctor who became a U.S. Senator from the state of Maine for a very short term. Born in Bolton, Massachusetts, he graduated from Harvard College in 1812 and from Harvard Medical School in 1817. At first settling in Wiscasset, and subsequently in Hallowell, Maine, he finally removed to Bath, Maine in 1845. He was collector of customs at Bath from 1845 and 1846 and commenced practice of medicine in that city. He was lecturer on obstetrics at Bowdoin College from 1846 to 1854, and professor of that branch from 1855 to 1866.

He was elected to the United States Senate as a Republican to fill the vacancy caused by the resignation of Hannibal Hamlin and served from January 16 to March 3, 1857. He then became judge of probate of Sagadahoc County, Maine in 1860. He died at Bath in 1877 and is buried in Hallowell, Maine.

Sources

External links

 

1794 births
1877 deaths
People from Bolton, Massachusetts
Republican Party United States senators from Maine
Maine Republicans
19th-century American politicians
People from Bath, Maine
People from Wiscasset, Maine
People from Hallowell, Maine
Harvard College alumni
Harvard Medical School alumni
Bowdoin College faculty